Vitisin B is a resveratrol tetramer found in plants of the genus Vitis.

References

External links 
 Vitisin B on www.chemindustry.com
 Website of the Schröder group

Resveratrol oligomers
Natural phenol tetramers
Grape varieties